Red admiral may refer to:

Butterflies
 Vanessa atalanta, in North Africa, the Americas, Europe, Asia, and the Caribbean
 New Zealand red admiral, Vanessa gonerilla
 Vanessa indica, the Indian red admiral
 Vanessa vulcania, the Canary red admiral

People with the nickname
 António Alva Rosa Coutinho (1926–2010), Portuguese admiral and participant in the Carnation Revolution
 Didier Ratsiraka (born 1936), President of Madagascar 1975–1993 and 1997–2002

See also
 Admiral of the Red, a former senior rank of the Royal Navy

Animal common name disambiguation pages